The 2019–20 Florida Gators women's basketball team represents the University of Florida during the 2019–20 NCAA Division I women's basketball season. The Gators, led by third-year head coach Cameron Newbauer, play their home games at the O'Connell Center and compete as members of the Southeastern Conference (SEC).

Preseason

SEC media poll
The SEC media poll was released on October 15, 2019.

Schedule

|-
!colspan=9 style=| Exhibition

|-
!colspan=9 style=| Non-conference regular season

|-
!colspan=9 style=| SEC regular season

|-
!colspan=9 style=| SEC Tournament

References

Florida Gators women's basketball seasons
Florida
Florida Gators
Florida Gators